The 2016 Hartlepool Borough Council election took place on 5 May 2016 to elect members of Hartlepool Borough Council in England. This was on the same day as other local elections.

Results Summary

Ward Results

References

2016 English local elections
2016
2010s in County Durham